Peter Barker (born 26 September 1983 in Harold Wood, England) is a professional squash player from Upminster, England.

Barker reached a world ranking of 13 in November 2007, the same month that he was selected to represent the senior England team at the World Team Championships in December 2008, held in India.

Peter Barker has 12 professional tour titles to his name out of 15 final appearances. In September 2008, Barker defeated David Palmer twice, with a decisive 3–0 victory over David Palmer in Chicago at the Sweet Home Chicago Open, and a 3–2 victory in Baltimore at the Merrit Properties Open. Barker's highest world ranking of 5 was reached in December 2012.

In 2010, Barker won the bronze medal in the 2010 Commonwealth Games squash men's singles event in Delhi after defeating Mohd Azlan Iskandar from Malaysia in straight sets, 11-5, 11–4, 11–2. The match ended in 45 minutes. Barker had a match point against Ramy Ashour in the quarterfinals of the 2012 U.S. Open, but ended up losing the match. Ashour would go on to win the US Open, beating Gregory Gaultier in the finals.

Barker attended Brentwood School from 1995 to 2002.

Barker is currently a broker (ish).

See also
 Official Men's Squash World Ranking

References

External links 

People from Harold Wood
People from Upminster
English male squash players
1983 births
Living people
People educated at Brentwood School, Essex
Squash players at the 2010 Commonwealth Games
Commonwealth Games bronze medallists for England
Commonwealth Games silver medallists for England
Commonwealth Games medallists in squash
Competitors at the 2013 World Games
Medallists at the 2010 Commonwealth Games